George Carey (born 1935) is a former archbishop of Canterbury.

George Carey may also refer to:
Sir George Carey (c. 1541 – 1616) (or Cary), Lord Deputy of Ireland
George Carey, 2nd Baron Hunsdon (1547–1603), English soldier and Member of Parliament for Hertfordshire and Hampshire
George Carew, 1st Earl of Totnes (1555–1629), also known as George Carey
George Saville Carey (1743–1807), entertainer and miscellaneous writer
(George) Carey Foster (1835–1919), English chemist and physicist
George R. Carey (fl. 1878), American inventor
George Carey (ice hockey) (1892–1974), Scottish-Canadian ice hockey right winger
George Carey (filmmaker) (born 1943), British documentary filmmaker and television journalist
George Jackson Carey (1822–1872), British Army officer
George W. Carey (1845–1924), American physician
George Carey (footballer) (born 1943), Australian rules footballer

See also
George Cary (disambiguation)
George Carew (disambiguation)